Lalit Maken [October 16, 1951 - January 1, 1985] was a Member of parliament, a political leader of Indian National Congress and a labour union leader. Maken was the son-in-law of late President of India, Shankar Dayal Sharma.

In the year of 1984, he was elected to the Lok Sabha as a Member of parliament, a directly elected lower house of the Parliament of India from South Delhi of India. He was a metropolitan Councillor prior to his election to Parliament of India.

Sikh Murders 1 In a 31-page booklet titled 'Who Are The Guilty', People's Union for Civil Liberties (PUCL) listed 227 people who allegedly led the mobs, which killed up to 17,000 Sikhs over three days. Lalit Maken's name was third on the list. This allegation, though, has never been proved.

Assassination 
Maken and his wife Gitanjali, the daughter of the then future president Shankar Dayal Sharma, were gunned down by Harjinder Singh Jinda, Sukhdev Singh Sukha and Ranjit Singh Gill alias Kukki for his alleged involvement in riots outside Maken's Kirti Nagar residence in West Delhi on 31 July 1985 Lalit Maken was gunned down, when he was moving towards his car parked across the road from his house in Kirti Nagar, New Delhi. All three assailants continued firing even as Maken ran towards his house for cover. Maken's wife Geetanjali and a visitor, Balkishan, were also caught in the firing. Maken's wife was still alive but later died on her way to the hospital. The assailants escaped on their scooters. Lalit Maken, Gitanjali Maken and Balkishen were taken to All India Institute of Medical Sciences, New Delhi. The postmortem examinations were conducted by a team of doctors headed by T D Dogra.

Police later arrested Sukhdev Singh Sukha in the year of 1986 and Harjinder Singh Jinda in the year of 1987. Both of them were later sentenced to death for the murder of Indian Army general Arun Shridhar Vaidya (architect of Operation Blue Star) and on 9 October 1992, they were hanged in Yerwada Central Jail in Pune in Indian state of Maharashtra. As per Indian request, Ranjit Singh "Gill" was arrested by Interpol in New Jersey, USA on 14 May 1987, a federal magistrate approved his extradition on 6 February 1988 after he requested to go back home (the request was earlier denied thrice) and he was deported back to India in February 2000 after lengthy legal cases and was sentenced to life imprisonment on 24 February 2003. Finally his life sentence was commuted on 20 May 2009.

Family
Former Minister of Youth Affairs and Sports, Government of India, Ajay Maken is his nephew. His only child (daughter), Avantika Maken married Suchiter Sharma in 1997. Later, she filed a divorce and married Ashok Tanwar in 2005, former President of Indian Youth Congress and Member of Parliament.

Both Ajay Maken and Avantika Maken had requested the early release of Lalit Maken’s killer Ranjit Singh Gill alias Kukki.

References

1951 births
1985 deaths
1985 murders in India
Assassinated Indian politicians
People murdered in Delhi
Indian murder victims
Deaths by firearm in India
Trade unionists from Delhi
Lok Sabha members from Delhi
India MPs 1984–1989
Indian National Congress politicians
Victims of Sikh terrorism